The Coordinator of United States Government Activities to Combat Malaria Globally, known usually as the U.S. Global Malaria Coordinator, is an official overseeing all U.S. Government worldwide activities to combat malaria, most notably the President's Malaria Initiative. The position is presidentially appointed within the U.S. Agency for International Development. The current acting coordinator is Julie Wallace. For its first eleven years the post was occupied by Admiral Tim Ziemer.

List of U.S. Global Malaria Coordinators 

 R. Timothy Ziemer (RADM, Ret.) (June 2006–April 2017)
 Kenneth Staley (April 2018–January 2021)
 Raj Panjabi (February 2021–February 2022) 
 Julie Wallace (acting) (February 2022–Present)

See also 

 U.S. Global AIDS Coordinator

References 

United States Agency for International Development